Butta Renuka is an Indian politician and a member of parliament from Kurnool, Andhra Pradesh. She is a member of the Yuvajana Sramika Rythu Congress. Her husband Butta Neelakantam, the leader of the Yuvajana Sramika Rythu Congress. She is one of the richest parliamentarians with total assets of more than 300 crores.

Biography 
She was educated in Dr. B.R. Ambedkar Open University. By 2014 she would be elected to the 16th Lok Sabha. On September 1, 2014, she became a member of the Committee on Empowerment of Women, Standing Committee on Rural Development, Consultative Committee, and Ministry of Human Resource Development. By 2015 she became a member of the General Body of the Central Social Welfare Board. In 2017 she became a member of the Central Supervisory Board.

References

India MPs 2014–2019
YSR Congress Party politicians
People from Kurnool district
Lok Sabha members from Andhra Pradesh
1971 births
Living people